Richard Harkness Templeton (September 23, 1877 – January 18, 1953) was an American lawyer from New York.

Early life 
Templeton was born on September 23, 1877 in Buffalo, New York, the son of Thomas Templeton, a contractor and builder, and Charlotte Harkness.

Templeton graduated from the Central High School in 1895. He then attended Syracuse University, graduating from there with an A.B. in 1897. After studying at Buffalo Law School, he studied in the law office of DeWitt Clinton.

Career
Templeton was admitted to the bar in 1901, and continued to work with Clinton until 1906, when he began his own private practice in Buffalo. In 1917, he became a member of the law firm Templeton, Turnbull & Templeton.

In 1925, President Coolidge appointed Templeton United States Attorney for the Western District of New York. He served in that office under Presidents Hoover and Franklin D. Roosevelt; although he was a lifelong Republican, the local Democrats were unable to come up with a successor for the first two years of Roosevelt's presidency. He served as U.S. Attorney until 1934. He also lectured on corporations for the University of Buffalo. He served as a major of the 74th Infantry, New York National Guard.

Templeton was a member of the Erie County Bar Association, the New York State Bar Association, the American Bar Association, Phi Kappa Psi, Phi Delta Phi, and the Freemasons.

Personal life
In 1908, he married Mai Morgan, a daughter of Mary Catherine ( Reese) Morgan and former Collector of the Port of Buffalo William J. Morgan. They had three children, Richard Harkness, Mary Reese, and Jean Morgan.

Templeton died on January 18, 1953. He was buried in Forest Lawn Cemetery in Buffalo.

References

External links 

 Richard H. Templeton at Find a Grave
 Richard Harkness Templeton Papers at Syracuse University Special Collections Research Center

1877 births
1953 deaths
Lawyers from Buffalo, New York
Syracuse University alumni
University at Buffalo Law School alumni
University at Buffalo faculty
20th-century American lawyers
New York (state) Republicans
United States Attorneys for the Western District of New York
New York National Guard personnel

American Freemasons
Burials at Forest Lawn Cemetery (Buffalo)